Daphnopsis is a plant genus in the family Thymelaeaceae. There are 50 to 65 species distributed in the Neotropics. They are shrubs and small trees with tubular or bell-shaped flowers. Individuals are dioecious, with male and female flowers produced on separate trees.

The Plant List accepts the following species:

Daphnopsis alainii Nevling
Daphnopsis alpestris (Gardner) Benth. & Hook.f. ex B.D.Jacks. 	
Daphnopsis americana (Mill.) J.R.Johnst.
Daphnopsis angustifolia C.Wright ex Griseb.
Daphnopsis anomala (Kunth) Domke
Daphnopsis bissei A.Noa Monzón
Daphnopsis boliviana Nevling
Daphnopsis brasiliensis Mart. & Zucc.
Daphnopsis brevifolia Nevling
Daphnopsis calcicola Ekman ex Urb.
Daphnopsis caracasana Meisn.
Daphnopsis cestrifolia (Kunth) Meisn.
Daphnopsis coriacea Taub.
Daphnopsis correae Barringer & Nevling
Daphnopsis costaricensis Barringer & Grayum
Daphnopsis crassifolia (Poir.) Meisn.
Daphnopsis crispotomentosa Cuatrec.
Daphnopsis cuneata Radlk.
Daphnopsis dircoides Steyerm.
Daphnopsis ekmanii Domke
Daphnopsis equatorialis Nevling
Daphnopsis espinosae Monach.
Daphnopsis fasciculata (Meisn.) Nevling
Daphnopsis ficina Standl. & Steyerm.
Daphnopsis filipedunculata Nevling & Barringer
Daphnopsis flavida Lundell
Daphnopsis folsomii Barringer & Nevling
Daphnopsis gemmiflora (Miers) Domke
Daphnopsis grandis Nevling & Barringer
Daphnopsis granitica Pruski & Barringer
Daphnopsis granvillei Barringer
Daphnopsis guacacoa C.Wright ex Griseb.
Daphnopsis guaiquinimae Steyerm.
Daphnopsis hammelii Barringer & Nevling
Daphnopsis hellerana Urb.
Daphnopsis hispaniolica Nevling
Daphnopsis lagunae Breedlove & León de la Luz
Daphnopsis liebmannii Nevling
Daphnopsis longipedunculata Gilg ex Domke
Daphnopsis macrocarpa Nevling
Daphnopsis macrophylla (Kunth) Gilg
Daphnopsis martii Meisn.
Daphnopsis megacarpa Nevling & Barringer
Daphnopsis mexiae Nevling
Daphnopsis mollis (Meisn.) Standl.
Daphnopsis monocephala Donn.Sm.
Daphnopsis morii Barringer & Nevling
Daphnopsis nevlingiana Steyerm.
Daphnopsis nevlingii J.Jiménez Ram.
Daphnopsis oblongifolia Britton & P.Wilson
Daphnopsis occidentalis (Sw.) Krug & Urb.
Daphnopsis occulta Nevling
Daphnopsis pavonii Meisn.
Daphnopsis perplexa Nevling
Daphnopsis peruviensis (Domke) J.F.Macbr.
Daphnopsis philippiana Krug & Urb.
Daphnopsis pseudosalix Domke
Daphnopsis punctulata Urb.
Daphnopsis purdiei Meisn.
Daphnopsis purpusii Brandegee
Daphnopsis racemosa Griseb.
Daphnopsis radiata Donn.Sm.
Daphnopsis sanctae-teresae Nevling
Daphnopsis schwackeana Taub.
Daphnopsis selerorum Gilg
Daphnopsis sellowiana Taub.
Daphnopsis steyermarkii Nevling
Daphnopsis strigillosa Lundell
Daphnopsis tuerckheimiana Donn.Sm.
Daphnopsis utilis Warm.
Daphnopsis weberbaueri Domke
Daphnopsis witsbergeri Nevling, Matek.is & Barringer
Daphnopsis zamorensis Domke

References

Thymelaeoideae
Malvales genera
Dioecious plants